Alanson Crossman (unknown – 1853) was an American blacksmith and politician who served in the first two sessions of the Michigan House of Representatives.

Biography 
Alanson Crossman was born in St. Johnsbury, Vermont, and was educated in Montpelier, Vermont.

He left St. Johnsbury on October 3, 1831, in the company of Henry Little and his family; the party arrived in Galesburg, Michigan, that November 5. Crossman settled in the town of Dexter, working as a blacksmith.

He was elected as a Democrat to the Michigan House of Representatives for its first session after the adoption of the state constitution in 1835, and re-elected to another term in 1835.

He died in 1853.

Family 

Crossman married Evelina Bailey Ewen, and they had at least one daughter, Jerusha Phelps Crossman.

Notes

References 
 
 
 

1853 deaths
Democratic Party members of the Michigan House of Representatives